Triplophysa cuneicephala is a species of stone loach in the genus Triplophysa. It is endemic to China and was first discovered from near Beijing.

References

C
Freshwater fish of China
Endemic fauna of China
Taxa named by Shaw Tsen-Hwang
Taxa named by Tchang Tchung-Lin
Fish described in 1931